The Europe and Africa Zone is one of the three zones of the regional Davis Cup competition in 2015.

In the Europe and Africa Zone there are four different groups in which teams compete against each other to advance to the next group. Winners in Group I advance to the World Group Play-offs, along with losing teams from the World Group first round. Teams who lose their respective ties will compete in the relegation play-offs, with winning teams remaining in Group I, whereas teams who lose their play-offs will be relegated to the Europe/Africa Group II in 2016.

Participating teams

Seeds:
The top three seeds received a bye into the second round.

 
 
 
 

Remaining nations:

Draw

 and  relegated to Group II in 2016.

First round

Russia vs. Denmark

Sweden vs. Austria

Slovakia vs. Slovenia

Romania vs. Israel

Poland vs. Lithuania

Second round

Russia vs. Spain

Austria vs. Netherlands

Romania vs. Slovakia

Poland vs. Ukraine

First round play-offs

Israel vs. Slovenia

Denmark vs. Spain

Lithuania vs. Ukraine

Second round play-offs

Denmark vs. Sweden

Slovenia vs. Lithuania

References
 Draw

Euro Africa Zone I
Davis Cup Europe/Africa Zone